J.S.S. Academy of Technical Education, Bengaluru (JSSATEB), or in its full name Jagadguru Sri Shivarathreeshwara Academy of Technical Education, Bengaluru, is an engineering college in Bangalore, India established in 1997 and managed by JSS Mahavidyapeetha, Mysore.

Campus
The campus is located in on a hilly 21 acre campus on the  Uttarahalli-Kengeri main road in close proximity to Rajarajeshwari Nagar on the southwestern edge of Bangalore City.

Academics

JSS Academy of Technical Education, Bengaluru is approved by All India Council for Technical Education and the seven UG engineering programs are accredited by The National Board of Accreditation. The institute is affiliated to Visvesvaraya Technological University, Belagavi, Karnataka, India. 

JSS Academy of Technical Education, Bengaluru offers undergraduate, graduate and research programs in Engineering, Science and Management. All the departments are recognized as Research Centres by the affiliating university.  The institute has seven engineering education departments, three basic sciences departments, one management education department and 4 support centres including placement and professional enhancement department. It has student strength of more than 3000. The total faculty strength is 178 out of which 78 are doctorates and remaining are pursuing their doctoral degrees in different domains.

Ranking

The National Institutional Ranking Framework (NIRF) ranked it in the 251-300 band among engineering colleges in 2020.

Students' Achievements

 In June 2005 - team 'Famous Four' from Department of Computer Science and Engineering was amongst the finalist representing India out of total 278 worldwide teams in Windows ChallengE (Organized by Microsoft in association with the Computer Society of the IEEE). Final event was conducted in Microsoft's Redmond, Washington campus. Team's idea (named after nightingale) was based upon a novel approach towards 'Emergency Medical Response system'.
In May 2010,Team Agni from the Departments of Mechanical Engineering and Industrial Engineering, participated in the Formula SAE in Michigan, and were one of the only two teams from India.
In October 2010,Team Zduhac from the Department of Mechanical Engineering won the consolation prize for the Glider built according to Problem statement of competition named "The Wright Design" sponsored by Airbus at Shaastra (Indian Institute of Technology Madras Technical fest) out of the 54 teams that participated.
 Students have fared well in VTU examinations and secured university ranks - ECE (one student), CSE (three students), IEM (six students) Its alumni are represented in industry and institutes of higher learning.
 In October 2019, the Students Club, Tachyon Motorsport from the Department of Mechanical Engineering participated in Rally Car Design Challenge (RCDC)- 2019 and bagged prizes in four different categories. The event was organized by M/s. AMZ Industries, Jaipur, Rajastan.
 In February 2020, a team under the SAE Collegiate Club from the Departments of Mechanical Engineering and Electronics & Communication Engineering participated in an event where a hybrid car called Range Extended Electric Vehicle (REEV) was built and has bagged the first prize with a cash prize of Rs. 60,000/-

See also
 JSS Science and Technology University (Formerly:Sri Jayachamarajendra College of Engineering)
JSSATE Noida

References

External links

Engineering colleges in Bangalore
Educational institutions established in 1997
1997 establishments in Karnataka